Clement Bissong (born 29 September 1983 in Calabar, Cross River State) is a football striker who plays for Dynamos.

Career
Bissong moved to Dynamos from Orlando Pirates in August 2008. He had only made one appearance for Pirates despite signing a three-year contract in August 2004.

References

1983 births
Living people
People from Calabar
Nigerian footballers
Orlando Pirates F.C. players
Calabar Rovers F.C. players
Association football forwards
Dynamos F.C. (South Africa) players